Phantasmagoria is a Big Finish Productions audio drama based on the long-running British science fiction television series Doctor Who. The story was written by Mark Gatiss and stars Peter Davison and Mark Strickson. It was recorded between 26–27 June 1999.

Phantasmagoria was considered a more "assured and confident" production than director, Nicholas Briggs', previous works. Gatiss' acting, who plays Jasper Jeake, was considered especially good in the audio play.

Synopsis
The Fifth Doctor and Turlough investigate mysterious goings-on at the Diabola Club in London, 1702, where patrons are disappearing after losing at cards to the mysterious Sir Nikolas Valentine.

Cast
The Doctor — Peter Davison
Turlough — Mark Strickson
Henry Gaunt — Nicholas Briggs
Quincy Flowers — David Walliams
Edmund Carteret — Jonathan Rigby
Jasper Jeake — Mark Gatiss
Poltrot/Librarian/Major Billy Lovemore — Jez Fielder
Sir Nicholas Valentine — David Ryall
Dr Samuel Holywell — Steven Wickham
Hannah Fry — Julia Dalkin

Plot
In the opening scene, Jasper Jeake, Quincy Flowers, Edmund Carteret and a fourth person are playing whist and discussing the coming succession of Queen Anne, at the Diabola Club (apparently a similar institution to the Hellfire Club). They argue and Carteret storms off, claiming a desire for adventure and excitement. Carteret is then approached by the sinister Sir Nicholas Valentine (introduced as a scholar, landowner and astrologer), and they agree to play cards. Carteret is later heard leaving alone furtively and acting "very queer". The following morning Valentine is heard to remark that he had good luck at cards the previous evening and inviting a down-at-heel school teacher to play with him the following evening.

Meanwhile, in the Tardis, the Doctor tries to teach Turlough the rules of cricket with the aid of a 1928 Wisden Cricketers' Almanack, and attempts to work out their time location from clues from the house they find themselves in. They are confronted by the home's owner, Dr Samuel Holywell, whom they deduce to be an antiquarian; they explain their presence on the pretext that they were delivering him the Tardis to form part of his collection. While the Doctor distracts Holywell, Turlough notices that some of his books are connected with necromancy. It then becomes apparent that the protagonists are being observed by an advanced intelligence, not from their current era. That evening, while the Doctor and Turlough are being entertained by Holywell, Jeake and Flower are robbed by Major Billy Lovemore (a highwayman) and lose their winnings from the previous night. Later Ned Cotton (a drunken watchman) encounters Holywell's maid, Hannah Fry, outside Holywell's house and assaults her. Hearing her cries, Turlough comes to her rescue. Inside the house, Holywell informs the doctor that he has practical proof of the existence of ghosts and is in regular contact with them. Before Turlough can fight save Hannah from Cotton, they are distracted by a man running towards them as if chased invisible pursuers; he drops dead with a playing card in his hand. The Doctor puts the card into his Almanack. Holywell blames himself, believing the death to be a result of his contact with the ghosts.

In an aside, to the background of screams of torment, Valentine is heard to comment that only a little time remains until his work is complete. Following the altercation between Turlough and Cotton, Turlough has gone missing and the Doctor attempts to locate him. He notes that the dead man has numerous coins and promissory notes in his pockets and Holywell informs him that there have been a number of disappearances like Turlough's recently. Holywell claims that he has been able to contact the spirits of these missing persons through his experiments. Turlough, it becomes apparent, has fallen and injured his head but has been rescued by Flowers and Jeake. Holywell tells the doctor that twenty-four people have gone missing within a mile of the Diabola Club. Meanwhile, Lovemore murders Cotton, citing vengeance as the reason. In the Diabola Club, Poltrot is playing cards with Valentine and notes that Valentine never removes his gloves. This is dismissed by Valentine as a gambler's superstition. Flowers confronts Valentine about Carteret's disappearance. Valentine claims that Carteret left after a few hands, and invites Flowers to play with him and Poltrot. Later Jeake and Turlough see Flowers leaving the club, looking pale and avoiding them.

Holywell, the Doctor and Hannah hold a seance in an attempt to locate the missing persons. They hear sounds that remind them of the death outside Holywell's house, and represent a series of numbers. Meanwhile, Turlough and Jeake decide to follow Flowers. They catch up with him and he asks for help, claiming that he is pursued by devils and a thousand voices. The voices are calling out numbers which the Doctor recognises as radio signals; he believes the Tardis can locate the source. Meanwhile, Valentine is heard telling Carteret that he will be used for "restoration". In the Tardis the Doctor discovers that the source of the radio signal has been blocked. The Doctor instructs Holywell and Fry to look into the disappearances to find a pattern. Holywell discovers that a spate of young men in their prime disappearing in the area has happened every thirty years and finally connects this with the Diabola Club. It becomes apparent that outside observers are looking for someone and have noticed the presence of the Doctor in addition to their quarry. The Doctor and Holywell arrive at the club (leaving Fry behind) to find Valentine playing cards with Pultrot, who is quickly dismissed; the Doctor takes over playing with Valentine. The Doctor wins with an Ace of Hearts and Valentine tells him to keep the card. The Doctor decides to retire, leaving Turlough and Jeake in the Diabola.  They follow Valentine after he leaves the club. Meanwhile, Lovemore is heard talking to the alien presence, stating that he believes Valentine is the person they are looking for and he will now cast off his fake identities and confront Valentine. It is revealed that both Lovemore and Fry are his fake identities.

The Doctor discovers that the playing card he was given by Valentine is a tracking device, calling the 'spirits' to him, and realises that he must destroy it; this causes the 'spirits' to depart. Valentine is heard to comment that if he could have the Doctor's mind it would complete his work. The Doctor realises that Valentine is stealing his victims' consciousnesses; each card is tailored to its victim's touch, which is why Valentine wears gloves when playing cards. These trapped consciousnesses are the spirits or ghosts which are summoned to the card once it has been activated. The Doctor discovers a way to reprogram the card he took from the dead man to claim a new victim when he or she touches it, and conceals it in his Almanack. Hannah returns and reveals herself to be the same person as Lovemore and an alien, but justifies her criminal life as a response to the gender stereotypes of the era. She goes on to disclose that Valentine is in fact Carthok of Deodalis, a deranged tyrant who escaped execution; she has been hunting him in revenge for the death of her family at his hands. Meanwhile, Jeake and Turlough arrive at Valentines laboratory and are detained and disarmed by Valentine; in their cell they find Carteret, who appears to be bordering on insanity. The Doctor and Holywell confront Valentine, who admits his true identity the murder of Fry/Lovemore's parents, and explains that he needs the consciousness of his victims to power his bio-mechanical ship to escape from the earth where he has been trapped. He has been healing his ship every thirty years by feeding it people's minds. Fry/Lovemore tries to force Valentine to return to Deodalis to face his execution but she is disabled by Valentine's defence systems. Valentine then decides to use her brain (rather than the Doctor's) to complete his repairs, and she is placed in a machine. The Doctor pleads for her life in exchange for what he claims is an item of great power but is in fact his Almanack (which he refers to as "the Wisdens"). He pretends to try to escape with the Almanack, and when Valentine/Carthok opens the book he touches the concealed card-trap and the consciousness/spirits he uses to capture his victims turn on him and kill him, led by Fry/Lovemore who also dies in the struggle.

References

External links
Big Finish Productions – Phantasmagoria

Fifth Doctor audio plays
1999 audio plays
Works by Mark Gatiss
Fiction set in 1702